The following is a list of the French government ministers in the administration of Pétain under the Third Republic.

See also 

 Government of Vichy France
 Fall of France
 Maurice Papon
 Service du travail obligatoire
 Vichy France
 Vichy 80
 Vichy Holocaust collaboration timeline
 Occupied France
 Zone libre

References

Sources

Further reading 

 Diamond, Hanna, and Simon Kitson, eds. Vichy, resistance, liberation: new perspectives on wartime France (Bloomsbury, 2005).
 Gordon,  Bertram M. Historical Dictionary of World War II France: The Occupation, Vichy, and the Resistance, 1938-1946  (1998).
 Jackson, Julian. France: The Dark Years, 1940-1944 (Oxford UP, 2004).
 Paxton, Robert. Vichy France: Old Guard, New Order, 1940-1944 (Knopf, 1972). online

External links 
 

Content in this edit is translated from the existing French Wikipedia article at :fr:Gouvernement Philippe Pétain; see its history for attribution.

 

1940 in France
French people of World War II
German occupation of France during World War II
Military history of France during World War II
Vichy France
World War II political leaders
World War II-related lists

fr:Gouvernement Philippe Pétain
ru:Правительство маршала Петена